Vish Iyer (born on 29 June 1974 as Vishwanath Iyer in Chennai, India) is an American author, Yoga Guru, transformational speaker, actor and entrepreneur. He is best known for his Om meditation, pranayama, and integration of yoga and love techniques. Iyer's wedding documentary was bought by Time Warner, which primarily highlighted his integration of yoga and love techniques. He is the author of Yoga & Love.

Early life and career
Vish Iyer was born in Chennai, as Vishwanath Balasubramanian Iyer to Orthodox Tamil speaking Hindu Brahmin parents. At the age of 13, Iyer's father migrated to Botswana, Southern Africa to start the first private Engineering institute in Botswana. Iyer did his undergraduate degree in biology, a master's degree in French and completed his first masters in business from the University of California, San Diego and second masters  in information systems from San Diego State University. He started his career as a software consultant and moved to Southern Africa and later the U.S, with his wife Deypika. He has always had a keen interest in Hollywood and to pursue his goals he attended UCB and actors workshop studios to learn acting skills.

In 2004, Iyer built $55 million real estate business with his partners and in 2008 he lost it due to his judgment errors that put him back into his deep yogic roots. This failure led him to pursue teaching yoga meditation, conduct workshops on relationships that led to a movement in the United States to connect Yoga meditation and love, where he claimed to reduce the divorce rate. He combined principles of Vedic Yoga (Classical Yoga), Sankya (Hindu Psychology), modern neuroscience, applying mantra & powerful meditation techniques along with his personal experience of finding his wife Deypika on a movie set. Iyer was recognized as a Yoga meditation expert and was invited on several TV and radio shows including NBC, ABC, USC balance, Kron TV, Time warner and others.

On his wife’s recommendation, putting his acting career in Hollywood on hold to write Yoga & Love that explains how yoga can help in finding true love. The book primarily focuses on the transformation through Yoga as a path to love, a self-help guide for the modern world and covers his personal experience and life which explains how he manifested his wife.

Iyer made his feature film debut as an actor in a Hollywood movie as a romantic lead in Tommy Friedman’s Neshima scheduled to be released in 2015. He is playing the romantic warrior in the movie. Iyer has also had bit parts in Bold & the Beautiful.

References

External links
 Official website

American yoga teachers
Living people
1974 births